MYTV Broadcasting Sdn. Bhd. or simply MYTV is a Malaysian television broadcasting private company providing free digital terrestrial television (DTT) in the country, considered a first of its kind in the country. The DTT service is officially branded as myFreeview since August 2015, though the legal name of the company remained unchanged A billion MYR deal have been signed with Telekom Malaysia to distribute the services. The set top box has been available for sale as of February 2017, after long delays of building infrastructure and other issues.

Its in-house service, myFreeview was officially launched at 6 June 2017. Its main competitor would be the free-to-view satellite & digital television based service, Astro NJOI which has huge more channels to view. Current coverage for this service in average of 99% .

History

Developments 
Taiwanese company Allion Labs, Inc. has been awarded accreditation from the Standards and Industrial Research Institute of Malaysia (SIRIM) to become the first lab facility for digital television in Malaysia. Around 30 channels have been set to broadcast in the first stage. HbbTV services are also integrated into MYTV service with the usage of Sofia Digital's HbbTV technology.

First phase 
East Coast Peninsular Malaysia has been chosen as the first site for testing followed by East Malaysia, and northern and southern Peninsular Malaysia before reaching Klang Valley.

Transmission fee 
According to MYTV, the initial annual rental fee for a 24-hour free-to-air TV channel was RM 12 million for a SDTV channel and RM 25 million for an HDTV channel for a continuous 24 hour slot. However, following reports of Media Prima might quit free-to-air transmission due to unviable fees, MYTV may introduce bandwidth based charging, which is already in consideration. On a statement given by MYTV CEO, Michael Chan announced that transmission fees will be waived until June 2018, when Malaysia completes DTT migration by terminating analogue transmission. Rebates will be also given on a case-by-case basis for six months up to the end of 2018. He is also looking to bring the transmission fee down to between RM8 million and RM18 million, since the Malaysian TV market do not accept fees of RM12 million or RM25 million per channel. The transmission cost for each SD and HD channel was eventually revised to RM6.7 million and RM7.4mil respectively per year.

Distributions 

According to former Malaysian Communication and Multimedia Minister Ahmad Shabery Cheek, the MYTV Basic decoder would be distributed to around two million select Malaysian households while other recipients would be determined later. All 2 million households had now been determined and it would be sent to recipients house via PosLaju.

Types of decoders used by MYTV Broadcasting 
There would be 3 types of set top boxes (STB) planned for use by MYTV, all with approved certification by "DTTV Malaysia". The first one is the trial test decoder, which was distributed to selected households for test transmission (which itself need to return to MYTV and eventually replaced by MYTV Basic STB). There are two standard set-top boxes issued, the first being the "MYTV Basic" decoder to be given to 2 million selected households nationwide for free, while the other is the standard "MYTV Advance" decoder, which is sold for RM299 excluding GST at Pos Malaysia branches and selected electrical stores. CI slots comes as a standard for both set top boxes, which it may be used for pay TV in the future. The major differences for these set-top boxes is the latter one (MYTV Advance) comes with support for HbbTV while MYTV Basic did not come with such support. MYTV has sign an agreement with Pensonic to distribute MYTV Advance set top box exclusively on 29 November 2016. Digital televisions with "DTTV Malaysia" certification can also be used to receive transmission.

Requirements to receive a free MYTV test decoder (known as MYTV Basic) 
 Came from low-income group.
 Included in the category of recipients of government aid.

While households that are not listed as recipients of government aid can purchased the certified DVB-T2 decoders or Integrated Digital TV (IDTV) from local distributor. It can also be found from online e-commerce platform such as Lazada and Shopee.

Channel list 
There are currently 11 Radio and 16 Television Channels listed on myFreeview, as approved by Ministry of Communications and Digital.

Television Channels

Radio Channels

Channels From Singapore

Channels From Brunei

Transmitters and frequencies 
According to MYTV, there are 13 test phase sites which will be operate on the first stage, which it currently covers around 80% of population. MYTV will eventually develop 60 main transmitters and 40 gap fillers which it will cover 98% of population.  Based on the information provided by myFreeview, 34 transmission sites are utilized to cover around 93% of Malaysian population via outdoor antenna.

Technical issues

2018 payment dispute between MYTV and TM for digital launch 
myFreeview viewers residing in some/all parts of Sabah, Sarawak, Kelantan, Terengganu, Pahang, Negeri Sembilan, Malacca and Perak are facing prolonged transmission issues since 11 and 25 October 2018, which 20 of 34 transmission sites has been taken down due to a payment dispute between Telekom Malaysia (TM) and MYTV Broadcasting. The remaining 14 sites were planned to be taken down by TM at 1 November but those sites was eventually not taken down after intervention by the Malaysian Communications and Multimedia Commission (MCMC). Digital TV transmission on all 20 affected sites was fully restored on 30 November 2018 after both parties reached a compromise.

See also

 List of television stations in Malaysia

References

External links 
 

Privately held companies of Malaysia
2014 establishments in Malaysia
Mass media companies established in 2014
Television in Malaysia
Digital terrestrial television in Malaysia